Joseph Mouawad (born 26 March 1970 in Mayfouq, Lebanon) is the current eparch of the Maronite Catholic Eparchy of Zahleh in Lebanon.

Life

Joseph Mouawad received his priestly ordination on 13 August 1995.

Pope Benedict XVI confirmed his appointment as Curial Bishop of Antioch and appointed him on 16 June 2012 Titular bishop of Ptolemais in Phoenicia dei Maroniti. Maronite Patriarch of Antioch, Cardinal Bechara Boutros al-Rahi, OMM ordained him on 28 July of the same year to the episcopate. His co-consecrators were Samir Mazloum, retired Curial Bishop of Antioch, Guy-Paul Noujaim, emeritus Curial Bishop in Joubbé, Sarba and Jounieh, Paul Youssef Matar, Archeparch of Beirut, Francis Némé Baïssari, Emeritus Auxiliary Bishop in Joubbé, Sarba and Jounieh, Paul Nabil El-Sayah, Curial Bishop of Antioch, Joseph Mohsen Béchara, Archbishop Emeritus of Antelias, Simon Atallah, OAM, Eparch of Baalbek-Deir El-Ahmar, François Eid, OMM, procurator of the Maronite Patriarch at the Holy See, Edgard Madi, Eparch of Nossa Senhora do Líbano em São Paulo, and Michel Aoun, Eparch of Byblos.

Mouawad was named Eparch of Zahleh on March 14, 2015.

External links
 http://www.catholic-hierarchy.org/bishop/bmouaw.html
 http://www.gcatholic.org/dioceses/diocese/zahl1.htm

1970 births
Lebanese Maronites
Living people
21st-century Maronite Catholic bishops
Eastern Catholic bishops in Lebanon